Adeiny Hechavarría Barrera (born April 15, 1989) is a Cuban professional baseball shortstop in the Atlanta Braves organization. He has played in Major League Baseball (MLB) for the Toronto Blue Jays, Miami Marlins, Tampa Bay Rays, Pittsburgh Pirates,  New York Yankees, New York Mets and Braves. He also played in Nippon Professional Baseball (NPB) for the Chiba Lotte Marines.

Early life
Hechavarria was born in Santiago de Cuba in Cuba to Diosmede and Mirta Hechavarria. He has an older brother, Alien.

Hechavarria participated in a Pan American tournament in Mexico in 2006, and played shortstop for the Cuban Junior National team in 2008. In 2009, he defected to Mexico on a boat with 11 others. Agents and other representatives of the Toronto Blue Jays watched him play in workouts in the Dominican Republic, and signed him after his visa paperwork went through in 2010.

Professional career

Toronto Blue Jays
On April 13, 2010, Hechavarria signed a four-year, $10 million contract with the Toronto Blue Jays. He was assigned to extended spring training and first appeared in a game with the Dunedin Blue Jays of the Class A-Advanced Florida State League. On June 30, 2010, Hechavarria was promoted to the Double-A New Hampshire Fisher Cats of the Eastern League, where he recorded a .273 batting average and .303 on-base percentage.

On August 4, 2012, Hechavarria was called up to the Toronto Blue Jays active roster for the first time. Hechavarria had a .312 batting average and had scored 78 runs in 102 games with the Triple-A Las Vegas 51s of the Pacific Coast League (PCL). He appeared in the Triple-A All-Star Game for the PCL.

Hechavarria played third base in his debut due to Brett Lawrie's oblique strain. Hechavarria finished his debut 0-for-3 with two strikeouts and one walk. Hechavarria recorded his first career hit on August 7, against the Tampa Bay Rays. Hechavarria was returned to Las Vegas on August 25, when Yunel Escobar returned to the Jays from paternity leave.
Hechavarria was recalled on August 26 when José Bautista and David Cooper were added to the disabled list. Hechavarria hit his first career home run, a solo shot off starter Phil Hughes, in a game against the New York Yankees on August 28, 2012.

Miami Marlins
On November 19, 2012, Hechavarria was traded to the Miami Marlins along with Henderson Álvarez, Jeff Mathis, Yunel Escobar, Jake Marisnick, Anthony DeSclafani, and Justin Nicolino, in exchange for Mark Buehrle, Josh Johnson, José Reyes, John Buck, and Emilio Bonifacio. On January 29, 2013, Hechavarria was named number 82 on MLB's Top Prospects list.

Hechavarria was the Marlins' starting shortstop for the first 14 games of the 2013 season until he was placed on the 15-day disabled list with a sore throwing arm. He was activated from the disabled list on May 2. On May 5, Hechavarria hit a bases-loaded triple and a grand slam against Roy Halladay of the Philadelphia Phillies. On June 8, Hechavarria had an RBI single off Shaun Marcum to score Plácido Polanco in what would be the game winner, as the Marlins beat the Mets in 20 innings. Overall, Hechavarria appeared in 148 games for Miami during the 2013 season. He batted .227./.267/.298, with 3 home runs and 42 runs batted in. He also recorded 8 triples and went 11–for–21 in stolen base attempts.

Hechavarria played in 146 games during the 2014 season. His average climbed to .276, 49 percentage points higher than the previous season. He had one home run, 34 runs batted in, and 10 triples. In 2015, Hechavarria made 130 appearances for the Marlins. He batted .281, hit 5 homers, and drove in 48 runs. He was named the National League Player of the Week on April 26 after posting a .500 batting average and 10 RBI during the preceding week.

During the 2016 season, Hechavarria appeared in 155 games. His batting average fell to .236. He had three home runs and 38 runs batted in. His .311 slugging percentage was the lowest of all qualified major league batters. He also had the lowest Isolated Power of all MLB players in 2016, at .075.

On May 10, 2017, Hechavarria went on the disabled list with a strained oblique muscle. In mid-June he played in 10 rehab games.

Tampa Bay Rays

On June 26, 2017, the Marlins traded Hechavarria to the Tampa Bay Rays for minor leaguers Braxton Lee and Ethan Clark. Hechavarria finished the year with a .267 batting average and a career high 8 home runs.

On April 26, 2018, Hechavarria broke Chris Gomez's 2002 franchise record by recording 242 consecutive chances without an error. He also owns the Rays franchise record for 71 consecutive games without an error. On August 1, 2018, Hechavarria was designated for assignment to clear space for the newly acquired Tommy Pham.

Pittsburgh Pirates 
On August 6, 2018, Hechavarria was acquired by the Pittsburgh Pirates in exchange for minor league right-handed pitcher Matt Seelinger. The Pirates also received cash considerations in the trade.

New York Yankees 
On August 31, 2018, the Pirates traded Hechavarria to the New York Yankees for a player to be named later. On October 3, 2018, Hechavarria played in his first ever postseason game, the 2018 American League Wild Card Game. He entered the game in the sixth inning as a defensive replacement for Miguel Andújar.

New York Mets 
On February 18, 2019, Hechavarria signed a minor league, spring training invite deal with the New York Mets. On May 3, Hechavarria triggered an opt-out clause in his deal, and the Mets selected his contract to their MLB roster. He was designated for assignment on August 9 to make room for newly signed second baseman Joe Panik. He was released on August 14. With the Mets in 2019 he batted .204/.252/.359 with five home runs and 18 RBIs.

Atlanta Braves
On August 16, 2019, the Atlanta Braves signed Hechavarria to fill the Braves' shortstop vacancy with Dansby Swanson on the injured list. In 2018 with the Braves he batted .328/.400/.639 in 61 at bats with four home runs and 15 RBIs. With both teams combined, in 2019 he batted .241/.299/.443 with nine home runs and 33 RBIs.

On January 16, 2020, the Braves re-signed Hechavarría to a one year deal worth $1 million.

In 2020 he batted .254/.302/.305 with seven runs, no home runs, and two RBIs in 59 at bats, playing second base primarily, as well as third base and shortstop.

Chiba Lotte Marines
On December 25, 2020, Hechavarria signed with the Chiba Lotte Marines of Nippon Professional Baseball on a one-year, $970K contract. On April 30, 2021, Hechavarria made his NPB debut. He played in 79 games for the team in 2021, slashing .203/.222/.314 with 4 home runs and 24 RBI. In 2022, Hechavarria hit .222/.251/.300 with 2 home runs, 20 RBI, and four stolen bases.

Atlanta Braves (second stint)
On January 30, 2023, Hechavarria signed a minor league contract with the Atlanta Braves organization.

See also

List of baseball players who defected from Cuba

References

External links

 
 

1989 births
Living people
Atlanta Braves players
Avispas de Santiago de Cuba players
Defecting Cuban baseball players
Dunedin Blue Jays players
Jupiter Hammerheads players
Las Vegas 51s players
Major League Baseball players from Cuba
Cuban expatriate baseball players in Canada
Cuban expatriate baseball players in the United States
Major League Baseball shortstops
Miami Marlins players
New Hampshire Fisher Cats players
New York Mets players
New York Yankees players
Peoria Javelinas players
Phoenix Desert Dogs players
Pittsburgh Pirates players
Sportspeople from Santiago de Cuba
Syracuse Mets players
Tampa Bay Rays players
Toronto Blue Jays players
Chiba Lotte Marines players